Eismann is a German surname, meaning "iceman". Notable people include:

 Daniel T. Eismann, American judge
 Johann Anton Eismann, Austrian painter
 Pavel Eismann, Czech footballer
 Peter Eismann, German politician
 Sören Eismann, German footballer

German-language surnames